Eliot Hamilton Fisk (born August 10, 1954) is an American classical guitarist.

Music career

Education and teaching
Fisk was born into a Quaker family in Philadelphia. He finished high school in DeWitt, New York, and then studied music at Yale University with harpsichordists Ralph Kirkpatrick and Albert Fuller. He received both B.A. and M.S. degrees, and in 1977 started Yale's guitar department. He was a student of guitarists Oscar Ghiglia, Alirio Díaz, and Andrés Segovia. He received private lessons from Segovia over the years and was  his last private student. Segovia became his mentor and one of his biggest admirers.

In 1989 Fisk became an instructor at the Mozarteum University of Salzburg in Austria and in 1996 at the New England Conservatory of Music in Boston. He created the Boston GuitarFest and is its artistic director.

Performing
Fisk has performed with orchestras around the world, including Orchestra of St. Luke's, Stuttgart Chamber Orchestra, Los Angeles Philharmonic, Houston Symphony, American Composers Orchestra, and the Pro Arte Orchestra. In chamber music settings, he has performed with the Juilliard String Quartet, Miró Quartet, Chilingirian Quartet, and Shanghai Quartet. He has performed and recorded with flautist Paula Robison; violinist Ruggiero Ricci, jazz guitarists Joe Pass and Bill Frisell, flamenco guitarist Paco Peña, and singer Ute Lemper. Early in his career he was in recitals with soprano Victoria de los Ángeles.

Transcriptions, commissions
Fisk has increased the amount of material available to classical guitarists by transcribing music written for other instruments. This increased repertoire includes his transcriptions of Bach, Scarlatti, Paganini, Mendelssohn, Mozart, Haydn and Schubert.

He has also expanded the body of music for classical guitar by commissioning new pieces from composers, such as Leonardo Balada, Robert Beaser, Luciano Berio, William Bolcom,  Nicholas Maw, Xavier Montsalvatge, George Rochberg, and Kurt Schwertsik.

Recording
In the 1990s, Segovia's widow gave Fisk unpublished compositions by Segovia. Fisk turned these compositions into Segovia: Canciones Populares, which became a bestseller on the Classical Album chart of Billboard magazine. His transcription of violinist Niccolò Paganini's 24 Caprices also entered the chart and was widely praised. He collaborated with Ernesto Halffter, at the request of Segovia, on Halffter's Concierto for Guitar and Orchestra, which was performed with the Spanish National Orchestra and then turned into an album. With flutist Paula Robison, he recorded Robert Beaser's Mountain Songs, which was nominated for a Grammy Award in 1987.

Awards and honors
 First place, International Guitar Competition, Gargnano, Italy (1980)
 Grammy Award nomination, Mountain Songs (1987)
 Grand Cross of Isabel la Cátolica, for contribution to Spanish music (2006)
 Teacher of the Year, New England Conservatory (2010)
 Best Classical Guitarist, Guitar Player magazine Readers Poll

Views on guitarists

Eliot Fisk has said:
 "It's true that Segovia didn't get compositions from Bartók, Stravinsky, Prokifiev and a lot of composers we would like to have pieces from. Maybe he was in a position to have done that, but on the other hand, who among us has done as much as he did? If other people were interested, they could've tried to commission them. Besides, this criticism of Segovia is pointless. If you disagree with what Segovia did, take that energy and go out and do something positive. Otherwise, shut up."
 "Now, it's different when John Williams, who studied with Segovia, says he wasn't a good teacher and the like. There is a difference in generation. [...] I didn't have Segovia butting into my life, telling me to do this and that. That's why John needed to rebel violently."
 "My rebellion is in truth against Bream and Williams; because I have to confess I'm a bit disappointed in both of them. From time immemorial, it has been the practice of one generation to pass on to the next what it learned. But my generation has almost no guitar fathers. Ghiglia and Diaz taught and were accessible, but Bream and Williams were not. [...] They've both given immensely. But growing up, I was very saddened by their inaccessibility. I feel that my generation lost a lot because of that. In a way, we all need to rebel. The next generation will rebel against us. It's one thing I encourage when teaching. I want to give my students the strength to tell me to go to hell. 'Cause if they can tell me to go to hell, they can tell the world. Ultimately, that will help them, not to be difficult but rather to have conviction for the long struggle."

Discography

References

Further reading
 Profile of Eliot Fisk.
 Profile of Eliot Fisk.

External links
 Official site
 
 

American classical guitarists
American male guitarists
1954 births
Living people
Yale University alumni
New England Conservatory faculty
Guitarists from Philadelphia
20th-century American guitarists
Classical musicians from Pennsylvania
20th-century American male musicians